Richard Brooks (April 14, 1942 – February 1, 2006) was an American NASCAR driver. Born in Porterville, California, he was the 1969 NASCAR Rookie of the Year, and went on to win the 1973 Talladega 500. Brooks held off veteran Buddy Baker by 7.2 seconds for the Talladega win.  After he retired, he served as a NASCAR sportscaster for a brief period of time. His Grand National statistics include the win at Talladega Superspeedway, 57 top fives, 150 top tens, 4 top-ten points finishes (1975 through 1978), and 358 career races. Although Brooks only won one NASCAR race, he was a popular figure in that  league of motorsports. Brooks drove for the underfunded Junie Donlavey team throughout his racing career.

Career

Brooks made his Grand National Series debut at the first Daytona 500 Qualifying Race in 1969, driving a self-owned Plymouth. Brooks had a solid year, and with 12 top-tens he finished 21st in the final standings. This also meant Brooks became the rookie of the year. He continued to drive his Plymouth in 1970 and scored 15 top-five finishes in 34 races, improving to 13th in the final points standings. Brooks came close to winning the 1970 Georgia 500, but eventually finished third to Richard Petty and Bobby Isaac after having led 133 laps. In 1971 Brooks moved to the team of Mario Rossi, driving the No. 22 Dodge. In 15 races with the team Books scored 12 top-ten finishes. His best run of the season came at Darlington were he finished second to Buddy Baker.

For the next two seasons, Brooks did not have a full-time ride and practically picked up whatever ride came up. Brooks started the 1972 season at the Atlanta 500, driving the No. 90 Ford for Junie Donlavey. Brooks made three additional starts for Donlavey with a best finish of eighth, at the Winston 500. Brooks also drove five races for Marvin Welty but failed to finish any of them. Brooks only finished one other race that year, when he drove for Bill Champion at the Texas 500. Brooks started out his 1973 season driving the No. 6 Owens Racing Dodge to a third place finish at the Daytona 500. He returned to Donlavey and drove eight races for that team in 1973. The highlight of Brooks's career came at the Talladega 500, when he drove the Plymouth of Jimmy Crawford to an unexpected victory. Brooks was not supposed to drive Crawford's Plymouth, but after officials ruled that Crawford did not have enough experience on the big speedway, Brooks took over the ride.

Without a ride for the 1974 season, Brooks started to field a self-owned Dodge. Of the 16 races that Brooks entered that year he finished three times. His best finish of the season was in the Volunteer 500 at Bristol International Speedway.

Brooks returned to Donlavey for the 1975 season, driving the No. 90 Ford once again. In 25 races Brooks scored 15 top-ten finishes of which he finished six in the top five. His best result that season was a second place, in the Delaware 500 at Dover Downs International Speedway. Brooks also finished in the top ten in the final points standings for the first time. He continued to drive for Donlavey Racing in 1976. Brooks scored 18 top-ten finishes that year and he finished 10th in the final points standings for the second year in succession. Brooks continued his good run for Donlavey Racing in 1977. He scored a total of 20 top-ten finishes that season of which he finished seven in the top five. He finished sixth in the final points standings, which would turn out to be a career high. Brooks had another good year in 1978, with 17 top-ten finishes. He finished eight in the final points standings and left the Donlavey team at the end of the season.

Brooks moved to the team of Nelson Malloch in 1979, driving the No. 05 Oldsmobile and Chevy. Brooks had a lot of mechanical issues during the season and only managed to finish 13 of 27 races that year. Brooks scored eight top-ten finishes during the year and finished 22nd in the final points standings. He stayed with Malloch for the 1980 season but left the team after he only finished five of the first 16 races. Brooks entered in three more races that season, which he drove for Banjo Matthews.

Brooks only drove five races each season in 1981 and 1982 before reuniting with Donlavey for 1983. After finishing fifth in the Daytona 500, he had several other solid runs. After four races, Brooks led the point standings for the only time in his NASCAR career. Brooks also led the most laps in the third race of the year, at Rockingham, but retired on lap 384. This was the only time in Brooks's career that he led the most laps during a race.  Brooks faded to 14th at season's end. In 1984, the Donlavey team struggled to keep up with the better-financed teams and Brooks finished 15th. After driving three races for the Petty Enterprises team in 1985, Brooks left. His final NASCAR race was behind the wheel of a Rick Hendrick-owned car in the 1985 World 600 where he finished in tenth place.

Midway through the 1994 season, Brooks purchased the No. 40 Pontiac team from SABCO Racing, inheriting driver Bobby Hamilton and sponsor Kendall Oil. Hamilton left for Petty Enterprises in 1995, and Brooks fielded the No. 40 for Greg Sacks, Rich Bickle, Shane Hall, Andy Hillenburg, Randy LaJoie, and Butch Leitzinger, but after a season which saw the car lead only two laps with a best finish of 12th, Brooks sold the team back to SABCO.

Later life and death

Brooks lent his name to a series of car dealerships in North and South Carolina.

After complications from a plane crash in late 2004,  Brooks died of pneumonia on February 1, 2006.

Motorsports career results

NASCAR
(key) (Bold – Pole position awarded by qualifying time Italics – Pole position earned by points standings or practice time * – Most laps led)

Grand National Series

Winston Cup Series

Daytona 500

24 Hours of Le Mans results

References

External links
 

1942 births
2006 deaths
24 Hours of Le Mans drivers
Motorsport announcers
NASCAR drivers
NASCAR team owners
People from Porterville, California
Racing drivers from California
World Sportscar Championship drivers
Hendrick Motorsports drivers